Carlos Arce may refer to:

 Carlos Arce (footballer, born 1985), Argentine right-back
 Carlos Arce (footballer, born 1990), Argentine midfielder